Overdrive is an Indian monthly automotive magazine.

Background 
The magazine was established in 2002, and is operated by Indian media and entertainment company Network 18. Infomedia India Limited (IIL) publishes the Hindi version of the magazine.

Sister publications
 Forbes India, the Indian edition of Forbes
 Better Photography, an Indian magazine for photo enthusiasts
 Better Interiors, an interior design publication

See also
List of magazines in India

References

2002 establishments in India
Automobile magazines
English-language magazines published in India
Hindi-language magazines
Monthly magazines published in India
Magazines established in 2002